Time Force is a Swiss luxury goods and watch manufacturer started by Christian Frommherz in 1991. The company was founded in Wallbach, Switzerland.

History
Time Force was founded by Christian Frommherz on 8 February 1991 in Wallbach, Switzerland. In 2000, he sold his shares to Jacques Bénédict Spa and ended his involvement with Time Force.

Jacques Bénédict acquired Time Force and a number of other watch brands including Givenchy, Favre Leuba, Time Force and Smalto to create the Time Force mini group.

Jacques Bénédict sold Time Force to Grupo Valentín in 2002 with an agreement that they would continue to produce and manufacturer Time Force timepieces.

Grupo Valentín, a corporation based in the Spanish capital of Madrid, re-inveted the brand and  created "Ultimate Concept Watches" slogan. During this period,  Time Force launched global campaigns and special collections with celebrities such as Rafael Nadal, Pau Gasol, Elsa Pataky, Cristiano Ronaldo, Oscar Córdoba, Gerard Piqué and Alberto Contador. A distribution and sales office in Dubai was also established during this period.

The Trusendi family of the Swiss watch industry, acquired the brand in 2019 to ensure its continuity, preserve the core values, and to once again return  the company back to its roots in Switzerland.

Brand Ambassadors

 Alberto Contador  - Cyclist & 2x Tour de France winner.

Oscar Cordoba - Pro Footballer, Columbian national team goalie.

Manolo Cardona - Columbian film & TV actor.

Pau Gasol - Professional Spanish & NBA All- Star basketball player.

Elsa Pataky -  Spanish model and actress.

Gerard Pique - Spanish former professional footballer.

Rafael Nadal - Spanish professional tennis player. Winner of 22 Grand Slam singles titles.
Christiano Ronaldo - Portuguese professional footballer.

Manuela Vázquez - Columbian professional race car driver.

References

External links
 Website

Watch manufacturing companies of Switzerland
Swiss watch brands
Manufacturing companies established in 1991
Privately held companies of Switzerland
Design companies established in 1991
Swiss companies established in 1991